Carlton High School is a public high school located in Carlton, Minnesota, United States.

The school operates under the Carlton Public School District, housing grades 6 through 12. It serves a population of approximately 350 students. The school competes athletically in region 7A of the Minnesota State High School League; its colors are blue and white, and its mascot is the Bulldog.

References

External links
  Carlton School District website

Public high schools in Minnesota
Schools in Carlton County, Minnesota
Public middle schools in Minnesota